Camiguin de Babuyanes is an active stratovolcano on Camiguin Island, part of the Babuyan Islands group that is located in Luzon Strait, north of the island of Luzon, in the Philippines.  The volcano and the island are within the jurisdiction of the municipality of Calayan, in the province of Cagayan. The island has a population of 5,231 people in 2020.

Physical features

The Philippine Institute of Volcanology and Seismology (PHILVOCS) lists Camiguin de Babuyanes as one of the active volcanoes in the Philippines.

All volcanoes in the Philippines are part of the Pacific ring of fire.

Eruptions
An eruption was recorded around 1857. It was reported as phreatic and possibly partly submarine.

In 1991, there were reports of volcanic activity but instrumental investigations showed no sign of unusual volcanic activity, such as intense fumarolic activity, felt earthquakes, fissuring at the volcano's slopes, or smell of sulphur.

Another report of volcanic unrest was reported in 1993 but an aerial survey of the volcano proved no signs of activity.

Geology
Formation of the island started during the Pliocene era with an andesitic volcano, followed by the subsidiary cones of Minabel to the north and Caanoan in the eastern part of the island.

See also
List of active volcanoes in the Philippines
List of potentially active volcanoes in the Philippines
List of inactive volcanoes in the Philippines
Philippine Institute of Volcanology and Seismology
Volcano

References

External links
Philippine Institute of Volcanology and Seismology (PHIVOLCS) Camiguin de Babuyanes page

Stratovolcanoes of the Philippines
Subduction volcanoes
Volcanoes of the Luzon Strait
Landforms of Cagayan
Active volcanoes of the Philippines